Siegfried Breuer (24 June 1906 – 1 February 1954) was an Austrian stage and film actor and occasional film director and screenwriter.

Biography 

Born in Vienna, Siegried was the son of Hans Breuer (1868 or 1870–1929), who was an opera singer and actor from Cologne. Performing was in the blood and he studied at the Academy of Music and Performing Arts in Vienna, some time in the early 1920s and made his stage debut at the Volkstheater, Vienna in 1924.

After some 15 years of stage acting he made his screen debut in a film called Eins zu Eins in 1939 where he went on to star in over 50 films between 1939 and 1954. In 1950 he directed, wrote and starred in the film Der Schuß durchs Fenster in which he worked with Curd Jürgens.

His son Siegfried Breuer Jr. and grandchildren Jacques Breuer and Pascal Breuer are also in the entertainment industry.

A heavy smoker, Breuer was married six times and died in 1954 in Weende, Göttingen at the age of 47.

Filmography 

 1931: Wochenend im Paradies
 1939: Immortal Waltz 
 1939: Linen from Ireland - Dr. Kuhn
 1939: Anton the Last - Lawyer
 1939: A Mother's Love - Kammersänger
 1939: Eins zu Eins
 1940: Nanette - 1. Schauspieler
 1940: Der Postmeister - Rittmeister Minskij
 1940: Vienna Tales - Egon von Brelowsky
 1940: Operetta - Fürst Hohenburg
 1941: Der Weg ins Freie - Graf Stefan Oginski
 1941: Venus on Trial - Benjamin Hecht, Kunsthändler
 1941: Menschen im Sturm - Hauptmann Rakic
 1942: Anuschka - Prof. Felix von Hartberg
 1942: Sommerliebe - Baron von Worowsky
 1943: Romance in a Minor Key - Viktor
 1943: Gabriele Dambrone - Paul Madina
 1943: Gefährlicher Frühling - Professor Alfred Lorenz
 1944: Orient Express - Baron Erich Hübner
 1944: Melusine - Stefan Brock
 1945: Am Abend nach der Oper - Rudolph Manders
 1945: Die tolle Susanne
 1946: Die Fledermaus - Prinz Orlowsky
 1947: The Immortal Face  - Fürst Catti
 1948: Alles Lüge - Berthold Plamershof
 1948: The Other Life - Bukowsky
 1948: Zyankali - Dr. Frank Morava
 1948: Anni - Alexander Radkofsky
 1948: Maresi - Tabakovitsch
 1949: Fregola - Pablo Mendez
 1949:  - Dr. Thomas Bratt, Lawyer
 1949:  - Harry Belmont
 1949: The Third Man - Popescu
 1950: Regimental Music 
 1949: Vagabonds - Andy Karr
 1950: Bonus on Death - Peter Lissen, Versicherungsagent
 1950: Der Schuß durchs Fenster (director)
 1950: Gabriela - Thomas Lorenzen
 1950: Seitensprünge im Schnee (director)
 1951: Eine Frau mit Herz - Manfred Schilling
 1951: Love and Blood - Il magistrato
 1951: Shadows Over Naples - Der Präfekt
 1951:  - Schulze
 1951:  - Oberst
 1952: In München steht ein Hofbräuhaus (screenwriter)
 1952: The Prince of Pappenheim - Juan Pablo de Gonzales
 1952: You Only Live Once - Rollincourt
 1952: When the Heath Dreams at Night - Konsul Berghaus
 1952: We're Dancing on the Rainbow - Sophokles
 1953: The Last Waltz - General Krasinski
 1953: The Bird Seller - Marquis de Tréville
 1953: Red Roses, Red Lips, Red Wine - Polizeipräfekt
 1953: Under the Stars of Capri - Reeder Bramfeld (final film role)

External links and sources 
 
 Photographs and literature

References 

1906 births
1954 deaths
20th-century Austrian people
20th-century Austrian male actors
Austrian male stage actors
Austrian male film actors
Austrian film directors
Austrian people of German descent
German-language film directors
Male actors from Vienna